The KrAZ-5401 cabover truck is manufactured at the KrAZ plant in Ukraine. It was first presented in 2013. 

KrAZ-5401 is provided engine YaMZ-536 rated at 312 hp, the MFZ-430 clutch and the 9JS119ТА mechanical transmission.

Technical characteristics 
Engine: YaMZ-536 6.65-liter diesel straight-six (Euro IV)
Power: 
Torque: 
Transmission: mechanical 9JS119ТА
Clutch: single disk MFZ-430
Axle configuration: 4x2
Payload: 5.000-13.500 kg

KrAZ vehicles
Cars of Ukraine
Military vehicles introduced in the 2010s